Donna Horton White (born April 7, 1954), née Donna Horton, is an American former professional golfer who played on the LPGA Tour for 15 years from 1977 to 1992.

Amateur career 
White was born in Kinston, North Carolina. She had a successful amateur golf career, and was a semi-finalist in the 1971 U.S. Girls' Junior.  In the U.S. Women's Amateur, she was a semi-finalist in 1973, runner-up in 1975 and winner in 1976. She also won the 1976 Trans-National Amateur.  She was a member of the winning Curtis Cup and Espirito Santo Trophy teams in 1976.

She attended the University of Florida in Gainesville, Florida, where she played for coach Mimi Ryan's Florida Gators women's golf team in Association for Intercollegiate Athletics for Women (AIAW) competition in 1975 and 1976. During her time as a Gator golfer, she was a four-time collegiate medalist.  She graduated from Florida with a bachelor's degree in health and human performance in 1976, and was inducted into the University of Florida Athletic Hall of Fame as a "Gator Great" in 1978.

Professional career 
White played on the LPGA Tour for 16 years (1977–1992). She won three Tour events, including the 1980 Florida Lady Citrus, the 1980 Coca-Cola Classic and the 1983 Sarasota Classic.  Her best finish in a LPGA major was a tie for second in the 1982 U.S. Women's Open. She also finished fourth at the 1984 du Maurier Classic after opening the final round one shot out of the lead. White retired after the 1992 season, with total career winnings of $908,589.

Personal 
She married Mike White; he also graduated from University of Florida, where he played baseball, in December 1976. He is a longtime school teacher in Belle Glade and she runs golf operations for Palm Beach County courses.

Professional wins

LPGA Tour wins (3)

LPGA Tour playoff record (1–1)

U.S. national team appearances
Amateur
Curtis Cup: 1976 (winners)
Espirito Santo Trophy: 1976 (winners)

See also 

List of Florida Gators women's golfers on the LPGA Tour
List of University of Florida alumni
List of University of Florida Athletic Hall of Fame members

References

External links 

American female golfers
Florida Gators women's golfers
LPGA Tour golfers
Winners of ladies' major amateur golf championships
Golfers from North Carolina
People from Kinston, North Carolina
1954 births
Living people